Noureddine Naybet (born 10 February 1970) is a Moroccan former professional footballer who played as a central defender. He played in Spain (Deportivo de La Coruña) and Portugal for Sporting CP and England for Tottenham Hotspur. He is considered one of the best defenders in La Liga of his generation. Naybet spent the longest and most successful period of his career with Deportivo La Coruña in Spain's La Liga, from 1996 to 2004. He was named the 44th greatest African player of all time by the African football expert Ed Dove. 

Naybet played a record 115 matches for the Morocco national team scoring four goals, representing the country in two World Cups and six Africa Cup of Nations tournaments.

Early life
Born in Casablanca on 10 February 1970, the young toddler, addicted to football, spent much of his time teasing the ball, in the streets of Derb Chorfa. Already talented and hardworking, he was quickly spotted by the Étoile de Casablanca, where he only stayed a week before joining Wydad Casablanca.

Club career

Wydad
Naybet began his professional career playing for Wydad, being part of the squads that won three Botola championships as well as the 1992 edition of the CAF Champions League.

Nantes and Sporting
From 1993 to 1996 he represented FC Nantes (France) and Sporting CP, being always an important first-team member and winning one domestic cup in each country. He played the 1995 Supertaça Cândido de Oliveira in 2 legged match against Porto, the first match ended in a 0–0 tie, as-well the second match ended in a 2–2 tie. Naybet found the net in the 42nd minute. Sporting won the replay match in a 3–0 victory.

Deportivo de La Coruña
In the 1996 summer Naybet signed a four-year deal with Spain's Deportivo de La Coruña, for roughly €1.6 million. He made his La Liga debut on 31 August 1996, playing the full 90 minutes in a 1–1 home draw against Real Madrid.

Naybet scored a career best four goals in the 1997–98 season, but the Galicians could only finish in 12th position. He was still an undisputed starter in 1999–2000 – often partnering Argentine Gabriel Schürrer – as the club conquered the first league in its history.

He won one La Liga league title in 1999–2000 La Liga, one Copa del Rey and two Spanish Super Cup. and for Sporting CP won Cup of Portugal.

In the 2000–01 UEFA Champions League, Naybet passed the first round qualification with ease, In the second round they were placed with Galatasaray, AC Milan, and PSG. In his first qualification match Naybet managed to defeat PSG, 3–1. They qualified to the knock out stages after topping the second round group stages. But were knocked out by Leeds United in the quarter-finals.

In the 2001–02 UEFA Champions League, Naybet played a major role during the Group stages playing its first match against Olympiacos which ended in a tie. They defeated Manchester United in their second match, 2–1, the winning Naybet goal in the last minute. They qualified top of their group and to the second round. On 12 March 2002, Naybet defeated Arsenal, 2–0. They were defeated by Manchester United in the quarter final in a 5–2 aggregate.

Naybet started in all his 13 UEFA Champions League appearances in the 2003–04 campaign, helping Dépor to the semi-finals of the competition. In the last-four's second leg, at home against FC Porto, he was sent off by Pierluigi Collina after two bookable offenses, and the tie ended 1–0 in favour of the Portuguese.

Tottenham Hotspur
On 12 August 2004, aged 34, Naybet joined Tottenham Hotspur for a reported fee of £700,000. He netted his first and only goal for the Spurs on 13 November, in a 5–4 North London derby loss to Arsenal at White Hart Lane.

After only three games in 2005–06, under new manager Martin Jol, Naybet was released and retired from football. In June 2005, however, he had renewed his contract for a further season.

He spent most of his 17-year professional career with Deportivo La Coruña, appearing in 284 competitive games and winning four major titles, including the 2000 national championship. He also competed in France, Portugal and England.

International career
Naybet was a Moroccan international for 16 years, gaining his first cap on 9 August 1990 in a 0–0 friendly draw in Tunisia. 

He competed in the 1992 Summer Olympics.

He proceeded to appear for his country in two FIFA World Cups, playing two games in 1994 and three in 1998 as both editions ended in group stage elimination.

Naybet played all six contests in the 2004 African Cup of Nations, helping the Atlas Lions finish second in Tunisia. In early January 2006, five months after announcing his international retirement after falling out of favour with coach Ezzaki Badou, he returned to the national team just ahead of the 2006 Africa Cup of Nations.

In August 2007, Naybet was named assistant manager under Henri Michel.

Style of play

He is a magnificent and well-rounded centre-back, who boasted all of the physical attributes as well as the mental qualities to excel in the heart of the defence for major European sides.

Personal life
A devout Muslim, Naybet observed fasting during the month of Ramadan, even when it coincided with the football season. However, he has been believed to be caught drinking recreationally.

Career statistics

International

Scores and results list Morocco's goal tally first, score column indicates score after each Naybet goal.

Honours
Wydad Casablanca
Botola: 1989–90, 1990–91, 1992–93
Moroccan Throne Cup: 1989
CAF Champions League: 1992
Afro-Asian Cup: 1993
Arab Club Champions Cup: 1989
Arab Super Cup: 1992

Sporting CP
Taça de Portugal: 1995
Supertaça Cândido de Oliveira: 1995

Deportivo La Coruña
La Liga: 1999–2000. runner-up 2000–01, 2001–02
Copa del Rey: 2001–02
Supercopa de España: 2000, 2002
UEFA Champions League Semi-finals: 2003–04

Morocco
Africa Cup of Nations runner-up: 2004
Hassan II Trophy runner-up: 2000
Hassan II Trophy 3rd place: 1996

Individual
Africa Cup of Nations Team of the Tournament: 1998
 IFFHS All-time Africa Men's Dream Team
 IFFHS All-time Morocco Men's Dream Team
 IFFHS CAF Men Team of the Century

See also
 List of men's footballers with 100 or more international caps

References

External links

Deportivo archives

1970 births
Living people
Moroccan Muslims
Footballers from Casablanca
Moroccan footballers
Association football defenders
Botola players
Wydad AC players
Ligue 1 players
FC Nantes players
Primeira Liga players
Sporting CP footballers
La Liga players
Deportivo de La Coruña players
Premier League players
Tottenham Hotspur F.C. players
Morocco international footballers
1994 FIFA World Cup players
1998 FIFA World Cup players
1992 African Cup of Nations players
1998 African Cup of Nations players
2000 African Cup of Nations players
2004 African Cup of Nations players
2002 African Cup of Nations players
2006 Africa Cup of Nations players
Olympic footballers of Morocco
Footballers at the 1992 Summer Olympics
Competitors at the 1991 Mediterranean Games
Mediterranean Games bronze medalists for Morocco
FIFA Century Club
Moroccan expatriate footballers
Expatriate footballers in France
Expatriate footballers in Portugal
Expatriate footballers in Spain
Expatriate footballers in England
Moroccan expatriate sportspeople in Portugal
Moroccan expatriate sportspeople in Spain
Moroccan expatriate sportspeople in England
Mediterranean Games medalists in football